The Flinders University Student Association (FUSA) is a student union at Flinders University, South Australia. It provides free welfare services, academic advocacy, grants for clubs and societies, and  funding for the student newspaper, Empire Times. It also organises an O'Week each semester, as well as various social events throughout the year.

FUSA does not have a structurally separate student representative body, and is overseen directly be an elected Student Council whose members are responsible for providing political representation to students.

History 
Between 1966 and 2006 the Student Association of Flinders University (SAFU) provided student representation on campus. When the Howard Government introduced voluntary student unionism in 2005 the organisation lost the vast majority of its funding and soon collapsed.

FlindersONE, a commercial company owned by the university, took over most of the services formerly provided by SAFU and a Student Representative Council (SRC) was created as a subcommittee of the FlindersONE board.

After the Gillard Government introduced the Student Services & Amenities Fee (SSAF) in 2011 representatives of the SRC began negotiations with university to create an independent student organisation. A funding agreement was reached with the university, and on 23 April 2012 the SRC voted to endorse the constitution of the Flinders University Student Association. Student representatives completed their terms and the first FUSA Student Council began on 1 January 2013.

Campaigns and activism 
FUSA has called for better public transport to the university from the Government of South Australia, citing the high number of students driving to campus and the low number of car parks provided by the university.

In 2015 FUSA and the National Tertiary Education Union organised an extended campaign against the Abbott Government's plans to create a $4 million policy center at the university run by climate skeptic Bjorn Lomborg. The organisers claimed that the proposal was done with no consultation with staff and students, and threatened the academic reputation of the university. In 2015 plans for the centre were dropped by the Turnbull Government.

Further reading 
 Graham Hastings, It can't happen here: a political history of Australian student activism (Students Association of Flinders University, 2003).

References

External links 
 Flinders University Student Association (Official Website)
 Empire Times (Official Website)

Students' unions in Australia